John Stewart (born 9 April 1983) is an Ulster Unionist Party (UUP) politician and businessman who has been a Member of the Northern Ireland Assembly (MLA) for East Antrim since 2017.

Early life and education
Stewart was born on 9 April 1983. He was educated at Carrickfergus Grammar School, a controlled grammar school in Carrickfergus, County Antrim, Northern Ireland. He studied history at Cardiff University, graduating with a Bachelor of Arts (BA) degree.

Career
Before his election to the assembly, Stewart worked as the sales director of his family's business, Robinson's Shoemakers, which is based in Carrickfergus, County Antrim.

Stewart serves in the Army Reserve (formally known as the Territorial Army). He is a soldier of the North Irish Horse.

Political career

Stewart joined the Ulster Unionist Party (UUP) in 2008. He was elected to Carrickfergus Borough Council in the 2011 local elections as a councillor for the Knockagh Monument electoral area. In 2014, he was elected to the newly created Mid and East Antrim Borough Council for Carrick Castle. He served as Deputy Mayor of Carrickfergus 2013–14.

On 2 March 2017, Stewart was elected to the Northern Ireland Assembly for East Antrim in stage 9 of the count. In the 2022 Assembly election he polled 6195 votes and was re-elected after the third count.

Personal life
Stewart is married to Deborah. He has two sons, Cohen and Harrison. He also has 2 office dogs Jaxon and Henry.

References

External links
Northern Ireland Assembly profile
Ulster Unionist Party profile

1983 births
Living people
Ulster Unionist Party MLAs
Northern Ireland MLAs 2017–2022
Politicians from County Antrim
Place of birth missing (living people)
Alumni of Cardiff University
British Yeomanry soldiers
People from Carrickfergus
Members of Carrickfergus Borough Council
Northern Ireland MLAs 2022–2027